Margaret, known as Margaret of Antioch in the West, and as Saint Marina the Great Martyr in the East, is celebrated as a saint on 20 July in the Western Rite Orthodoxy, Roman Catholic Church and Anglicanism, on 17 July (Julian calendar)  by the Eastern Orthodox Church and on Epip 23 and Hathor 23 in the Coptic Orthodox Church of Alexandria.

She was reputed to have promised very powerful indulgences to those who wrote or read her life, or invoked her intercessions; these no doubt helped the spread of her following.

Margaret is one of the Fourteen Holy Helpers, and is one of the saints Joan of Arc claimed to have spoken with.

Hagiography
According to a 9th-century martyrology of Rabanus Maurus, she suffered at Antioch in Pisidia (in what is now Turkey) in around 304, during the Diocletianic persecution. She was the daughter of a pagan priest named Aedesius. Her mother having died soon after her birth, Margaret was nursed by a Christian woman five or six leagues (6.9–8.3 miles) from Antioch.
Having embraced Christianity and consecrated her virginity to God, Margaret was disowned by her father, adopted by her nurse, and lived in the country keeping sheep with her foster mother. Olybrius, Governor of the Roman Diocese of the East, asked to marry her, but with the demand that she renounce Christianity. Upon her refusal, she was cruelly tortured, during which various miraculous incidents occurred.
One of these involved being swallowed by Satan in the shape of a dragon, from which she escaped alive when the cross she carried irritated the dragon's innards. Eventually, she was decapitated.

Historicity 
 
According to the Encyclopædia Britannica, Margaret's story is "generally regarded to be fictitious". The Catholic Encyclopedia states that "even the century to which she belonged is uncertain".

Doubts about her story are not new: already in the Middle Ages, hagiographer Jacobus de Voragine (author of the well-known Golden Legend) considered her martyrology to be too fantastic and remarked that the part where she is eaten by the dragon was to be considered a legend.

Veneration
The Greek Marina came from Antioch, Antioch in Pisidia (as opposed to Antioch of Syria), but this distinction was lost in the West. From the east her veneration spread towards England, France, and Germany, in the eleventh century, during the Crusades.

In 1222, the Council of Oxford added her to the list of feast days, and so her cult acquired great popularity. Many versions of the story were told in 13th-century England, in Anglo-Norman (including one ascribed to Nicholas Bozon), English, and Latin, and more than 250 churches are dedicated to her in England, most famously, St. Margaret's, Westminster, the parish church of the British Houses of Parliament in London. There is also a Saint Margaret Shrine in Bridgeport, Connecticut in the United States.

Feast day
She was recognised as a saint by the Catholic Church, being listed as such in the Roman Martyrology for 20 July.
She was also included from the 12th to the 20th century among the saints to be commemorated wherever the Roman Rite was celebrated, but was then removed from the general calendar along with a number of other European saints through the apostolic letter Mysterii Paschalis.

The Eastern Orthodox Church knows Margaret as Saint Marina, and celebrates her feast day on 17 July. Margaret is remembered in the Church of England with a commemoration on 20 July.

Every year on Epip 23 the Coptic Orthodox church celebrates her martyrdom day, and on Hathor 23 the Coptic church celebrates the dedication of a church to her name.
Saint Mary church in Cairo holds a relic believed to be Margaret's right hand, previously moved from the Angel Michael Church (modernly known as Haret Al Gawayna) following its destruction in the 13th century AD.

In 2022, Margaret was officially added to the Episcopal Church liturgical calendar with a feast day she shares with Catherine of Alexandria and Barbara of Nicomedia on 24 November.

Patronage
Margaret of Antioch is a patroness of pregnant women, servant maids, and against diabolical infestations.

Iconography
In art, she is often represented as a shepherdess, or pictured escaping from, or standing above, a dragon. While Western iconography typically depicts St. Margaret emerging from the dragon, Eastern Byzantine iconography tends to focus on her battle with the demon in her cell and depicts her grabbing him by his hair and swinging a copper hammer at his face.

See also
 Saint Marina the Monk and Saint Pelagia, both of whom are sometimes conflated or confused with Margaret

References

Citations

Sources
 Acta Sanctorum, July, v. 24–45
 Bibliotheca hagiographica. La/ma (Brussels, 1899), n. 5303–53r3
 Frances Arnold-Forster, Studies in Church Dedications (London, 1899), i. 131–133 and iii. 19.

External links

 Middle English life of St. Margaret of Antioch, edited with notes by Sherry L. Reames
 Book of the Passion of Saint Margaret the Virgin, with the Life of Saint Agnes, and Prayers to Jesus Christ and to the Virgin Mary 
 Catholic Online: Saint Margareth of Antioch
The Life of St. Margaret of Antioch

304 deaths
3rd-century births
4th-century Christian martyrs
4th-century Roman women
Christian folklore
Folk saints
Fourteen Holy Helpers
Late Ancient Christian female saints
People whose existence is disputed
Saints from Anatolia
Saints from Roman Anatolia
Syrian Christian saints
Anglican saints
Consecrated virgins